Iswar Chandra Vidyasagar Polytechnic (also known as I.C.V. Polytechnic), established in 1957, is a government polytechnic located in Jhargram, West Bengal. The polytechnic is affiliated to the West Bengal State Council of Technical Education, and recognised by AICTE, New Delhi. It offers diploma courses in Computer Science and Engineering, Electrical, Electronics and Telecommunication, Mechanical, Metallurgical and Civil Engineering.

References

External links
http://icvpolytechnic.in/

Universities and colleges in Jhargram district
Educational institutions established in 1957
1957 establishments in West Bengal
Technical universities and colleges in West Bengal